Seeta, sometimes wrongly spelled as Seta, is a township in Uganda.

Location

Seeta is located inside Mukono Town and is situated on the main highway (A-109) between Kampala and Jinja, on the Kampala-Jinja Highway. This location is in Mukono District, Central Region of Uganda.

Points of interest

The following points of interest lie within the township or close to its borders:

 Namilyango Road - The road starts at the Kampala-Jinja Highway and leads south to the village of Namilyango.
 Bukerere Road - The road starts at the Kampala-Jinja Highway and leads north towards Bukerere.
 offices and printing press of Red Pepper Publications - Producers of the weekly tabloid, The Red Pepper.
 Namanve Coca-Cola Factory - Located in neighboring Namanve.
 Rwenzori Mineral Water Bottling Company - Manufacture bottled water and other beverages.
 Seeta High School - A private, mixed, day and residential high school.
 Seeta Vocational Institute - A private day and residential vocational school on Bukerere Road.
 Sanit East Africa, manufacturer of cleaning and general sanitary products on Bukerere Road.
 IQRA, Nursery & Nursery Primary School, Seeta Bajjo

See also
Namanve
Namilyango
Namilyango College

References

Populated places in Uganda
Cities in the Great Rift Valley
Mukono District